Proletarskaya Kul'tura (English: Proletarian Culture) was a magazine published by Proletkult.

It was an important political and cultural publication in Russia following the Bolshevik seizure of power. It was edited by Pavel Lebedev-Polianskii and Fedor Kalinin. The magazine consisted of a series numbered up to 21, however as there were some multiple issues there were only 13 different publications They published such writers as Alexander Bogdanov and Aleksei Gastev.

In summer 1919, Rogozinsky's proposal to turn the Proletarian University into the Sverdlov Proletarian University, a proposal accompanied by restrictions in scope limited to creating a training school for government and party officials. That was backed up by an article in Izvestiya distinguishing between a 'proletarian' and 'communist' university, which would mean focusing on training party activists. Research into proletarian science, or producinga "Workers' Encyclopedia" would be set aside. When Maria Smith-Falkner, a professor at the Proletarian University, submitted a response which said that it was necessary to train leaders as well as organisers Izvestiya declined to publish it, and it appeared in Proletarskaya Kul'tura.

See also
 Proletarian culture

References

Further reading 
 Biggart, John; Georgii Gloveli; Avraham Yassour. 1998. Bogdanov and his Work. A guide to the published and unpublished works of Alexander A. Bogdanov (Malinovsky) 1873-1928, Aldershot: Ashgate. 

Magazines published in the Soviet Union
Defunct literary magazines published in Europe
Magazines established in 1918
Magazines disestablished in 1921
Russian-language magazines
Literary magazines published in the Soviet Union